Teretianax is a genus of minute sea snails, marine gastropod mollusks in the family Eulimidae.

Species
 Teretianax baculumpastoris (Melvill & Standen, 1896)
 Teretianax minuta (W. H. Turton, 1932)
 Teretianax pagoda Powell, 1926
 Teretianax suteri (W. R. B. Oliver, 1915)
 Teretianax trilirata (de Folin, 1873)
Synonyms
 Teretianax suta (Pilsbry, 1918): synonym of Chrystella suta (Pilsbry, 1918)

References

 Ponder, W. F. (1967). The classification of the Rissoidae and Orbitestellidae with descriptions of some new taxa. Transactions of the Royal Society of New Zealand, Zoology. 9(17): 193-224, pls 1-13.
 Takano T., Tsuzuki S. & Kano Y. (2020). Systematics relocation of Chrystella kajiyamai Habe, 1961 to the eulimid genus Bacula (Gastropoda: Vanikoroidea). Venus. 78(3-4): 119-124.

External links
 Iredale, T. (1918). Molluscan nomenclatural problems and solutions.- No. 1. Proceedings of the Malacological Society of London. 13(1-2): 28-40

Eulimidae